The Donald River is a river in the Hawke's Bay region of New Zealand.

The New Zealand Department of Conservation maintains a tramping track alongside the river.

References

Rivers of the Hawke's Bay Region
Rivers of New Zealand